Tarkwa Bay is an artificial sheltered beach located near the Lagos harbour in Nigeria.

Due to its island status, it is only accessible by boat or water taxis. The beach, popular with swimmers and water-sports enthusiasts, also has a welcoming resident community.

References

Beaches of Lagos
Artificial islands of Lagos